The 1960 Bucknell Bison football team was an American football team that represented Bucknell University in the 1960 NCAA College Division football season. Bucknell was awarded the Lambert Cup as the best small-college football team in the East.

In their third year under head coach Bob Odell, the Bison compiled a 7–2 record. Their 5–1 conference record placed second in the University Division of the Middle Atlantic Conference. Clifford Melberger was the team captain.

Bucknell played its home games at Memorial Stadium on the university campus in Lewisburg, Pennsylvania.

Schedule

References

Bucknell
Bucknell Bison football seasons
Bucknell Bison football